Chantal Jane Coady O.B.E. (born 1959), is a British  chocolatier, author and business woman, was born on 17 April 1959 in Tehran, Iran and has lived and worked in London since the mid-1970s. Founder of Rococo Chocolates in 1983, Coady was made OBE in the Queen’s Birthday Honours List of June 2014 "for services to chocolate making". She studied at Mary Datchelor School at the age of 16.

Following her departure from Rococo Chocolates Chantal has founded another venture trading as The Chocolate Detective focussed on sourcing slavery-free chocolate. Chantal has been appointed co-chair of [The Academy of Chocolate].

References 

Living people
1959 births
Chocolatiers
People educated at Mary Datchelor School